Matthäus Demetz (7 May 1902 – July 1941) was an Italian cross-country skier. He competed in the men's 18 kilometre event at the 1928 Winter Olympics.

References

External links
 

1909 births
1941 deaths
Italian male cross-country skiers
Olympic cross-country skiers of Italy
Cross-country skiers at the 1928 Winter Olympics
Place of birth missing